Banfi is a surname. It may also refer to:

People
Antonio Banfi (1886–1957), Italian philosopher and senator
Emilio Banfi (1881–unknown), Italian track and field athlete
Karina Banfi (born 1972), Argentine politician
Lino Banfi (born 1936), Italian film actor and presenter
Raúl Banfi (1914 –unknown), Uruguayan professional football player.
Rosanna Banfi (born 1963), Italian film, television and stage actress

Places
Banfi, Croatia, village in  northern Croatia

See also
Banfi Manor, old building in  northern Croatia